Roberto Carta is an Italian field hockey coach of the Italian women's national team.

He coached the team at the 2018 Women's Hockey World Cup.

References

1974 births
Living people
Italian field hockey coaches